Matthew "Matt" R. Walton (born August 24, 1973) is an American stage, film, and television actor.

Early life
Walton was born in Hampton, New Jersey, and attended Boston Conservatory, where he received a degree as a Musical Theater major and a Directing minor. After graduation he returned to New York City and studied with Wynn Handman, Tony Spiridakis, Stephan Jobes and acting coaches Anthony Abeson, Seth Barrish and Bob Krakower.

Career

Stage
Walton made his New York City debut Off-Broadway starring as Berger in the 30th anniversary production of Hair in 1997, and later reprised the role in Boston and at the Bay Street Theater in Sag Harbor, New York.

This performance in Hair led to roles in Off-Broadway premieres, including The Tailor Made Man, The Sweepers, We're All Dead, Rush's Dream, Gorilla Man, and The Framer.

He also played leads in New York and regional revivals of Beirut, Grease, Violet, Boy's Life, A Few Good Men, Proposals, Italian American Reconciliation, and Human Error.

He starred in the Off-Broadway production of Under My Skin, written by Robert Sternin and Prudence Fraser.

Parfumerie at The Wallis Annenberg Center in Beverly Hills.

It's Just Sex at the Actor's Temple in New York City.

Boeing-Boeing at the Paper Mill Playhouse in Milburn, New Jersey

Television and film
Walton's first television roles were on the soap operas Guiding Light, As the World Turns, and All My Children. Starting in 2009, he played Elijah Clarke on One Life to Live for 18 months.

Walton also played guest roles on Rescue Me, Royal Pains, Cashmere Mafia, The Bronx is Burning, and several episodes of Hallmark Hall of Fame.

Walton has appeared in over two dozen films, including Burn After Reading, Gigantic, and Armless.

Walton also played sportscaster Alex Reiser on the Comedy Central show Onion SportsDome, which premiered in January 2011.

Commercial and voice acting
Walton has acted in a number of ad campaigns, notably for Advil Cold and Sinus, Rooms to Go, Lowe's, Barclays, Speed Stick, Cablevision, Castrol, Cablevision and Old Navy.

He has worked as a voice-over artist in over 100 TV and radio commercials, promos and narrations for The Biography Channel, A&E Network, Bravo, the Travel Channel, Independent Film Channel, and Oxygen. He has also done the narration for a number of audiobooks, including Spider-Man 2, Sinbad: Legend of the Seven Seas, and Second Chance.

Online
Walton is a regular at CollegeHumor and gained national attention in the "Gangnam Style" parody "Mitt Romney Style".

Filmography

Film

Television

Videogames

References

External links
 
 

Living people
1973 births
Male actors from New Jersey
Boston Conservatory at Berklee alumni
American male film actors
American male television actors
American male soap opera actors
People from Glen Ridge, New Jersey
People from Hampton, New Jersey